Ridenbaugh Hall is a historic three-story building on the campus of the University of Idaho in Moscow, Idaho. It was built as a dormitory for female students in 1902. By the 1970s, it was the oldest brick building still standing on campus.

The building was designed by architect Willis Ritchie in the Renaissance Revival style. It has been listed on the National Register of Historic Places since September 14, 1977.

References

Residential buildings on the National Register of Historic Places in Idaho
National Register of Historic Places in Latah County, Idaho
Renaissance Revival architecture in Idaho
University and college buildings completed in 1902
University of Idaho buildings and structures
1902 establishments in Idaho
University and college buildings on the National Register of Historic Places in Idaho